Nicholas James Alexander, 7th Earl of Caledon,  (born 6 May 1955), is the Lord Lieutenant of Country Armagh, Northern Ireland, UK.

Life
Alexander is the son of Denis Alexander the 6th Earl of Caledon (1920-1980) and Anne Louise, Freiin de Graevenitz (1927-1963). He was educated at Gordonstoun in Elgin, Scotland. He  has been Lord Lieutenant of County Armagh since 1989 and is a Justice of the Peace. He was appointed Knight Commander of the Royal Victorian Order (KCVO) in the 2015 New Year Honours. He lives at Caledon, County Tyrone, Northern Ireland.

Family

Caledon has two sisters: Lady Tana Focke (born 1945) and Lady Elizabeth Jane Alexander (born 1962). He was married to Wendy Catherine Coumantaros from 1979 until 1985. He married Henrietta Mary Alison Newman on 19 December 1989 and they had two children: Frederick James Alexander, Viscount Alexander (born 15 October 1990) and Lady Leonora Jane Alexander (born 26 May 1993).. He married Amanda Cayzer in 2008.

References

1955 births
Living people
People educated at Gordonstoun
Knights Commander of the Royal Victorian Order
Lord-Lieutenants of Armagh
Nicholas
7